St Albans F.C. were a football club based in St Albans, England. They were founded in 1881 and competed in the Southern League in the 1897–98 and 1898–99 seasons.

The club played home matches at Clarence Park from 1894, prior to that they played at Bernards Heath, Holywell Meadows, Gombards, St Albans.

They disbanded in 1904. St Albans City were established four years later.

References

Football Club
Defunct football clubs in Hertfordshire
Defunct football clubs in England
Southern Football League clubs
Association football clubs established in 1881
Association football clubs disestablished in 1899
1881 establishments in England
1904 disestablishments in England